38 Special discography consists of 12 studio albums, four compilation albums, and four live albums. Additionally, they have released 25 singles.

Albums

Studio albums

Live albums

Compilation albums

Singles

Soundtrack appearances
 "Back to Paradise" (from Revenge of the Nerds II: Nerds in Paradise) (1987)
 "Teacher, Teacher" (from Teachers) (1984)
 "Trooper With an Attitude" (from Super Troopers)

Video Albums

Bootlegs 
 1977 	My Father's Place, Old Roslyn 1977
 1979 	Rockin' in Old Roslyn
 1980 	Denver, Colorado 3/26/80
 1984 	Eldorado Road
 1984 	Wild Eyed and Live! in Long Island's Nassau Coliseum, July 1984
 1987 	Westwood One: Live at the Summit in Houston Texas 5-8-1987
 1988 	Memphis 1988
 2000 	Live in Concert (Memphis, TN)

References

Rock music group discographies